Highway 268 (AR 268, Ark. 268, and Hwy. 268) is a designation for two state highways in Marion County. One route of  runs from Highway 14 to Marion County Road 227 (CR 227, B Rodgers Cir) and CR 259 (Locust Rd). A second route in south Marion County runs  from Highway 14 to the Buffalo National River. Both routes are maintained by the Arkansas State Highway and Transportation Department (AHTD).

Route description

Western Marion County
The route begins at Highway 14 in northeast Marion County within the Ozark Mountains. The route serves as a short rural route near Bull Shoals Lake, running northeast to and intersection, where it meets Marion CR 227 (B Rodgers Cir) and CR 259 (Locust Rd). The roadway continues east as CR 259/Locust Rd, with CR 227 running north from the intersection.

Buffalo River
Highway 268 begins at Highway 14 in southern Marion County near the unincorporated community of Mull. The route runs east to the Buffalo National River. This access point on the river was formerly owned and operated by the Arkansas Department of Parks and Tourism as Buffalo River State Park, but was re-designated as the United States' first National River under National Park Service jurisdiction in 1972.

History
The section in western Marion County was added to the state highway system on May 23, 1973, pursuant to Act 9 of 1973 by the Arkansas General Assembly.

Major intersections

See also

 List of state highways in Arkansas

References

External links

268
Transportation in Marion County, Arkansas